The USANA Amphitheatre is an outdoor amphitheater, located in West Valley City, Utah. The Amphitheater is named after USANA Health Sciences, a manufacturer of nutritional supplements.  It offers a view of the Wasatch Mountains. The venue opened July 2003.

Phish performed and recorded their show, on July 15, 2003, which was later released as a live album, entitled Live Phish 07.15.03.

The amphitheater has also played host to music festivals, including the X96 Big Ass Show, Curiosa, Crüe Fest, Crüe Fest 2 and the Uproar Festival.

See also

 List of contemporary amphitheatres
Live Nation

External links

 Live Nation Venue Page

References

Buildings and structures in West Valley City, Utah
Amphitheaters in the United States
Music venues in Utah
Tourist attractions in Salt Lake County, Utah
Music venues completed in 2003